Wyoming is a historic railway station located at Wyoming, Kent County, Delaware. It was built by the Delaware Railroad in 1872, and is a one-story, five bay, brick, Italianate-style building.  It has a low hipped roof with shallow eaves, round-headed doorways and windows, and a projecting bow-front window. The station has been renovated for use as town offices.

It was added to the National Register of Historic Places in 1980 as the Wyoming Railroad Station.  It is located in the Wyoming Historic District.

References

External links
Town of Wyoming website

Railway stations on the National Register of Historic Places in Delaware
Italianate architecture in Delaware
Railway stations in the United States opened in 1872
Transportation buildings and structures in Kent County, Delaware
Former Pennsylvania Railroad stations
Historic district contributing properties in Delaware
National Register of Historic Places in Kent County, Delaware
Former railway stations in Delaware
1872 establishments in Delaware